Pagasa is a genus of damsel bugs in the family Nabidae. There are about 11 described species in Pagasa.

Species
These 11 species belong to the genus Pagasa:
 Pagasa confusa Kerzhner, 1993 i c g
 Pagasa costalis Reuter, 1909 g
 Pagasa fasciventris Harris, 1940 i c g
 Pagasa fusca (Stein, 1857) i c g b
 Pagasa fuscipennis Reuter, 1909 g
 Pagasa insperata Hussey, 1953 i c g
 Pagasa luteiceps Walker, 1873 g
 Pagasa nigripes b
 Pagasa pallidiceps (Stål, 1860) i c g
 Pagasa pallipes Stål, 1873 i c g
 Pagasa signatipennis Reuter, 1909 g
Data sources: i = ITIS, c = Catalogue of Life, g = GBIF, b = Bugguide.net

References

Further reading

 
 

Nabidae
Articles created by Qbugbot